The Stadio Renato Curi is a football stadium in the Italian city of Perugia.

It is home to A.C. Perugia Calcio. The stadium is named after Renato Curi (1953–1977), who died from a heart attack during a game against Juventus on 30 October 1977. Its capacity is 28,000 spectators.

History
The stadium, designed by Luigi Corradi, was built in 1974 in only three months time in Pian di Massiano outside the old center of Perugia. The use of Stadio Santa Giuliana was considered too small after AC Perugia was promoted to the top tier of Italian soccer, the Serie A. Until renaming of Stadio Renato Curi in 1977 it was named Stadio Pian di Massiano.

International matches
Five international matches of the Italy national football team have taken place at the Stadio Renato Curi:

References

Renato Curi
Renato
A.C. Perugia Calcio
Sports venues in Umbria